Glenn Corneille (13 July 1970 in Venlo – 23 August 2005 in Baarn) was a Dutch jazz pianist. He studied at the Conservatory of Maastricht graduating in 1995 as a teacher. In 2004 he was part of Dominique van Hulst's production team.

He played on albums by Boris, Do, Ben Cramer and Alessandro Saffina and was known as one of the pianists in the television programme "De notenclub", which was hosted by Nance and in which Danny Wuyts was the other pianist

Glenn died in a car accident on 23 August 2005 and a benefit concert was performed in his honor.

References

External links
Official Homepage Glenn Corneille
Writing affairs

1970 births
2005 deaths
Dutch jazz pianists
Maastricht Academy of Music alumni
People from Venlo
Dutch people of Indonesian descent
Indo people
Road incident deaths in the Netherlands
20th-century pianists
Nationaal Songfestival contestants